Lakya Anantharamaiah Ravi Subramanya (born 20 May 1958) is an Indian politician and member of the Bharatiya Janata Party. He is a member of the Karnataka Legislative Assembly from the Basavanagudi constituency in Bangalore district. He is married to Manjula Ravi Subramanya. In the 2019 Indian general election his name was one of many recommended for contesting from the Bangalore South (Lok Sabha constituency), but in the end his nephew Tejasvi Surya was chosen.

References

External links 
 

Politicians from Bangalore
Bharatiya Janata Party politicians from Karnataka
Living people
Karnataka politicians
1958 births
Karnataka MLAs 2018–2023
Karnataka MLAs 2008–2013
Karnataka MLAs 2013–2018